Thomas McNamara (born March 29, 1983) is an American politician serving as the 40th Mayor of Rockford, Illinois. McNamara assumed office on May 1, 2017.

Career 
McNamara got his start as a politician serving as alderman of Rockford's 3rd ward, where he currently resides with his family. On April 4, 2017, McNamara won a landslide victory, winning just over 68% of votes cast for four mayoral candidates.

McNamara is the youngest son of former Rockford mayor John McNamara, who served from 1981 to 1989.

He is the 40th mayor of Rockford, but is serving in the 41st term of office. C. Henry Bloom served two terms under the former two-year term government, from 1933–1937, followed by three terms under the current four-year term for the mayor's office, 1941–1953. Charles F. Brown served in the four years between Bloom's two non-consecutive terms in office.

References

External links
 Office of the Mayor

1983 births
Living people
John Carroll University alumni
Mayors of Rockford, Illinois
Illinois Democrats
Mayors of places in Illinois